Roman Mitichyan (born September 4, 1978) is an Armenian-American professional mixed martial artist, actor and stuntman. He briefly appeared on Spike TV's reality show The Ultimate Fighter: Team Hughes vs. Team Serra, as a part of Team Serra, but was forced to leave the show due to injury.

Biography
Mitichyan was born in Vanadzor. He started training at the age of eight in freestyle wrestling, before switching to training in Sambo and Judo under Baxshik Saroyan. Mitichyan and his family moved to America in 1997, and he started training at the Hayastan Judo Club under Gene Lebell and Gokor Chivichyan. In 2000, he settled in Los Angeles with the intention of pursuing an acting career.

MMA career
Mitichyan amassed a 4-1 MMA record before appearing on The Ultimate Fighter: Team Hughes vs. Team Serra. He broke his elbow during the pre-team selection evaluation, and was immediately removed from the show before he had an opportunity to fight. However, he was brought back to fight on the show's finale, where he defeated Dorian Price via ankle lock submission in only 23 seconds, earning him a contract with the UFC. In his following fight at UFC Fight Night 13, he was defeated by fellow TUF 6 alumnus George Sotiropoulos via TKO in the second round, thus resulting in the UFC cutting ties with him.

Acting career
Roman has performed roles and stunts in various films and television shows, including NUMB3RS, Dexter, Felon, 24, NCIS: Los Angeles, Takers, CSI: Miami, Sons of Anarchy, NCIS, CSI: NY, John Wick, Furious 7, Escape Plan 2: Hades, and Vice.

Mixed martial arts record

|-
|Win
|align=center|8–3
|William Sriyapai
|Submission (triangle choke)
|Lights Out Promotions - Chaos at the Casino
|
|align=center|1
|align=center|0:52
|Inglewood, California, United States
|
|-
|Win
|align=center|7–3
|Preston Scharf
|Decision (unanimous)
|MEZ Fights
|
|align=center|3
|align=center|3:00
|Hollywood, California, United States
|
|-
|Win
|align=center|6–3
|Mike Dolce
|Decision (unanimous)
|Call to Arms - Called Out Fights
|
|align=center|3
|align=center|5:00
|Ontario, California, United States
|-
|Loss
|align=center|5–3
|Jason Meaders
|KO
|California Xtreme Fighting
|
|align=center|3
|align=center|2:41
|El Monte, California, United States
|
|-
|Loss
|align=center|5–2
|George Sotiropoulos
|TKO (punches)
|UFC Fight Night 13
|
|align=center|2
|align=center|2:24
|Broomfield, Colorado, United States
|
|-
|Win
|align=center|5–1
|Dorian Price
|Submission (Achilles lock)
|The Ultimate Fighter 6 Finale
|
|align=center|1
|align=center|0:23
|Las Vegas, Nevada, United States
|
|-
|Win
|align=center|4–1
|Mike Robles
|KO (knee)
|WTFC
|
|align=center|3
|align=center|3:50
|Highland, California, United States
|
|-
|Win
|align=center|3–1
|Mike Penalber
|Submission (rear naked choke)
|California Xtreme Fighting 3
|
|align=center|1
|align=center|3:50
|Upland, California, United States
|
|-
|Loss
|align=center|2–1
|James Wilks
|Submission (armbar)
|Universal Above Ground Fighting: Ultimate Cage Fighting 4
|
|align=center|2
|align=center|N/A
|Upland, California, United States
|
|-
|Win
|align=center|2–0
|Brad Mohler
|Submission (heel hook)
|Reality Submission Fighting: Shooto Challenge
|
|align=center|1
|align=center|N/A
|Belleville, Illinois, United States
|
|-
|Win
|align=center|1–0
|Bong Fedalizo
|Submission (armbar)
|Kage Kombat 14
|
|align=center|1
|align=center|0:52
|Los Angeles, California, United States
|

Selected filmography

Film

Television

References

External links
 
 
 
 

1978 births
Living people
Armenian emigrants to the United States
Armenian male mixed martial artists
People from Vanadzor
Welterweight mixed martial artists
Mixed martial artists utilizing freestyle wrestling
Mixed martial artists utilizing sambo
Mixed martial artists utilizing judo
Armenian male actors
American people of Armenian descent
American male film actors
American male television actors
20th-century American male actors
Ultimate Fighting Championship male fighters